Callisia fragrans, is a plant species of the genus Callisia, in the family Commelinaceae.

Description

The fleshy stem of the herb grows to a height of 1 metre. 25-centimetre-long leaves become violet if exposed to strong sunlight. Blossoms are white and fragrant.

Range and cultivation
Callisia fragrans, also called golden tendril is endemic to Mexico, and naturalized in the West Indies, scattered locations in the United States, and a few other places. It has been cultivated in many countries as an indoor ornamental since the early 1900s. However, it can be also found growing outdoors in warmer climates in moist, fertile soil. The herb likes partially shaded areas.

Medicinal properties
It has a rich folkloric reputation as an antiviral and antimicrobial plant. Especially in Eastern Europe, its leaves are used for treatment of various skin diseases, burns and joint disorders. An ethanol leaf extract has been shown to effectively inhibit the infection of Vero cells by HSV-1, HSV-2 and an ACV-resistant strain of the latter, in vitro. The ethanol leaf extract, as opposed to an aquatic extract, was however ineffective against VZV. Though the ethanol leaf extract had a lower selectivity index (toxicity vs. effectiveness) than ACV, it was able to inhibit the HSV-2 mutant, and may be less toxic than ACV. Direct interaction with the viruses and blocking of their access to the host cells seems to be involved.

References

External links 

fragrans
Endemic flora of Mexico
Plants described in 1840
Garden plants